This is a list of people associated with the modern Switzerland and the Old Swiss Confederacy. Regardless of ethnicity or emigration, the list includes notable natives of Switzerland and its predecessor states as well as people who were born elsewhere but spent most of their active life in Switzerland. For more information see the articles Swiss people and Demographics of Switzerland.

Archaeology

Eric Breuer, archaeologist
Ferdinand Keller (1800–1881), archaeologist
Heinrich Menu von Minutoli (1772–1846), archaeologist

Jean-Marc Moret (born 1942), archaeologist and art historian
Fritz Puempin (1901–1972), archeologist and painter
Karl Schefold (1905–1999), classical archaeologist

Architecture

Adolphe Appia (1862–1928), architect and scenic designer
Hans Auer (1847–1906), known for his design of the Federal Palace
Erwin Friedrich Baumann (1890–1980), architect and sculptor
Hans Benno Bernoulli (1876–1959), architect
Melchior Berri (1801–1854), architect
Max Bill (1908–1994), architect, artist, designer
Francesco Borromini (1599–1667), architect in Italy
Mario Botta (born 1943), architect
Paolo Bürgi (born 1947), landscape architect
Le Corbusier (Charles-Edouard Jeanneret) (1887–1965), architect
Ernst Cramer (1898–1980), renowned garden architect
Justus Dahinden (1925–2020), architect, professor
Albert Frey (1903–1998), architect
Domenico Fontana (1543–1607), architect in Rome

Carlo Fontana (1634–1714), architect in Italy
Domenico Gilardi (1785–1845), architect charged with rebuilding Moscow after 1812
Jacques Herzog (born 1950), architect
Jost Franz Huwyler-Boller (1874–1930), hotel architect
Pierre Jeanneret (1896–1967), architect
William Lescaze (1896–1969)
Carlo Maderno (1556–1629), architect in Italy
Pierre de Meuron (born 1950), architect
Hannes Meyer (1889–1954), architect, director of the Bauhaus Dessau
Flora Steiger-Crawford (1899–1991), first woman architect to graduate in Switzerland
Domenico Trezzini (1670–1734), architect in Saint Petersburg
Bernard Tschumi (born 1944), architect associated with Deconstructivism
Peter Zumthor (born 1943), winner of the 2009 Pritzker Prize

Actors

Ursula Andress (born 1936), actress
Giuseppe Bausilio (born 1997), performs on Broadway in the titular role of Billy in the Tony-award-winning musical Billy Elliot
Jean-Luc Bideau (born 1940), comedian
Dimitri (1935–2016), clown
Annemarie Düringer (1925–2014), film, television and stage actress
Bruno Ganz (1941–2019), actor 
Kat Graham (born 1989), actress, singer, model
Viktor Giacobbo (born 1952), actor and comedian
Mathias Gnädinger (1941–2015), actor
Curt Goetz (1888–1960), actor and film director
Grock (1880–1959), clown
Gardi Hutter (born 1953), clown, entertainer and actress
Rebecca Indermaur, actress

Irène Jacob (born 1966), actress
Marthe Keller (born 1945), actress and opera director
Mathis Künzler (born 1978), film, television and stage actor
Max Loong (born 1980), actor and producer
Stephanie Morgenstern (born 1965), actress, filmmaker, and screenwriter for television and film 
Vincent Pérez (born 1964), actor and director
Liselotte Pulver (born 1929)
Maximilian Schell (1930–2014), actor and producer
Michel Simon (1895–1975), actor and comedian
Emil Steinberger (born 1933), comedian

Art

Jacques-Laurent Agasse (1767–1849), painter
Cuno Peter Amiet (1868–1961)
Thomas Ammann (1950–1993), art dealer and collector
Albert Anker (1831–1910)
Jean Arcelin (born 1962), painter
Jean Arp (1886–1966), sculptor, painter and poet
René Auberjonois (1872–1957), painter
John Bernhard (born 1957), photographer
François Bocion (1828–1890), painter
Arnold Böcklin (1827–1901), painter
Karl Bodmer (1809–1893), painter of the American West
Ferdinand Brader (1833–1901), folk art sketch artist of rural farm life in USA
Mark Staff Brandl (born 1955), painter, installation artist, and critic
Sonam Dolma Brauen (born 1953), Swiss-Tibetan sculptor and painter
Frank Buchser (1828–1890), painter
Alexandre Calame (1810–1864), painter
Jean Crotti (1878–1958), painter
Adèle d'Affry (1836–1879), artist and sculptor
Jean Dunand (1877–1942), decorative artist, sculptor
Hans Erni (1909–2015)
Fischli & Weiss (born 1946 & 1952), artist duo
Adrian Frutiger (1928–2015), typeface designer
Henry Fuseli (Johann Heinrich Füssli) (1741–1825), painter
Johann Caspar Füssli (1706–1782), portrait painter
Johann Kaspar Füssli (1743–1786), entomologist
Karl Gerstner (1930–2017), graphic designer and painter
Salomon Gessner (1730–1788)
Alberto Giacometti (1901–1966), sculptor, painter
H. R. Giger (1940–2014), illustrator
Anton Graff (1736–1813), painter
Eugène Grasset (1845–1917), decorative artist
Willi Gutmann (1927–2013), sculptor
Stefan Haenni (born 1958), painter
Andreas Heusser (1976), conceptual artist and curator
Ferdinand Hodler (1853–1918), painter

Max Huber (1919–1992), graphic designer
Anna Indermaur (1894–1980), painter and sculptor
Robert Indermaur (born 1947), painter and sculptor 
Angelica Kauffman (1741–1807), painter
Jorg Khun (1940–1964), wildlife artist and illustrator
Paul Klee (1879–1940), painter
Rudolf Koller (1828–1905), painter
Rosa Lachenmeier (born 1959), contemporary artist
Catherine Leutenegger (born 1983), visual artist
Albert "Lindi" Lindegger (1904–1991), illustrator and painter
Rochus Lussi (born 1965), artist
Niklaus Manuel (1484–1530), painter
Auguste de Niederhausern-Rodo (1863–1913), sculptor
Sibylle Pasche (born 1976), sculptor
Roger Pfund (born 1943), painter, graphic designer
James Pradier (1790–1852), sculptor
Oskar Reinhart (1885–1965), collector
Iris von Roten-Meyer (1917–1990), lawyer and artist

Jacques Sablet (1749–1803), painter
Niki de Saint Phalle (1930–2002), sculptor, became Swiss in 1971
Albin Schweri (1885–1946), painter, glass painter
Peter Schweri (1939–2016), painter, illustrator
Nadja Sieger (born 1968), comedian, actress, jazz-vocalist, known as Nadeschkin
Gerold Späth (born 1939), Swiss poet and writer
Théophile Steinlen (1859–1923), painter and printmaker
Harald Szeemann (1933–2005), curator
Sophie Taeuber-Arp (1889–1943), painter, sculptor
Myriam Thyes (born 1963), new media artist
Jean Tinguely (1925–1991), kinetic artist
Rodolphe Toepffer (1799–1846)
Félix Vallotton (1865–1925), painter
Isabelle Waldberg (1911–1990), sculptor
Ricco Wassmer (1915–1972), painter
Marianne von Werefkin (1860–1938), painter

Aviation

Oskar Bider (1891–1919), aviation pioneer
Alfred Comte (1895–1965), pilot, co-director Ad Astra Aero, engineer
Raphaël Domjan (born 1972), explorer, founder and pilot of SolarStratos
Armand Dufaux (1883–1941)
Henri Dufaux (1879–1980)
Ernest Failloubaz (1892–1919), pilot, instructor, Swiss pilot's brevet number 1
René Grandjean (1884–1963), pilot, engineer
Else Haugk (1889–1973), first Swiss woman to earn a pilot's licence in May 1914
Walter Mittelholzer (1894–1937), pilot, director of Ad Astra Aero, Swissair

Claude Nicollier (born 1944), pilot, astronaut
Bertrand Piccard (born 1958), psychiatrist, balloonist, founder and pilot of Solar Impulse
Yves Rossy (born 1959), pilot, "jet-man"
Eduard Spelterini (1852–1931), balloonist
Emile Taddéoli (1879–1920), pilot, Swiss pilot's brevet number 2, chief pilot on seaplanes Ad Astra Aero

Business

Daniel Aegerter (born 1969), investor and entrepreneur
Carl Franz Bally (1821–1899), founder of the Bally Shoe company
Ernesto Bertarelli (born 1965), entrepreneur, founder of Team Alinghi
Daniel Borel (born 1950), founder of Logitech
Abraham-Louis Breguet (1747–1823), watchmaker
François-Louis Cailler (1796–1852), chocolatier
Arthur Chevrolet (1884–1946), automobile engineer, race car driver, entrepreneur
Louis Chevrolet (1878–1941), automobile engineer, race car driver, founder of Chevrolet
Raphael H. Cohen (born 1953), serial entrepreneur and business angel
Rolf Dobelli (born 1966), entrepreneur, author and founder of the World Minds foundation
Gottlieb Duttweiler (1888–1962), entrepreneur, founder of Migros
Alfred Escher (1819–1882), statesman, businessman and railway constructor
Hans Conrad Escher von der Linth (1767–1823), architect of the Lint melioration
Marc Faber (born 1946), investment analyst and entrepreneur
Louis Favre (1826–1879), engineer of the Gotthard tunnel
Elsa Gasser (1896–1967), economist, business executive
Nessim Gaon (1922–2022), financier, founder of the Noga company
Adolf Guyer-Zeller (1839–1899), railway entrepreneur
Nicolas Hayek (1928–2010), entrepreneur, chairman, Swatch Group

Pierre Hemmer (1950–2013), one of the Internet pioneers in Switzerland
Baron Jean-Conrad Hottinguer (1764–1841), banker
Henri Nestlé (1814–1890), founder of Nestlé S.A.
Daniel Peter (1836–1919), inventor of milk chocolate
Georges Edouard Piaget (1855–1931), watchmaker
Beat Fischer von Reichenbach (1641–1698), held postal monopoly in Berne
Werner Reinhart (1884–1951), industrialist, philanthropist, music and literature patron
Tibor Rosenbaum (1923–1980), businessman
Guy Spier (born 1966), investor, author
Philippe Suchard (1797–1884), chocolatier
Ernst Thomke (born 1939) in Biel/Bienne, turnaround manager, e.g. Swatch
Daniel Vasella (born 1953), chairman of Swiss pharmaceutical company Novartis AG
Yomi Denzel (born 1996), entrepreneur and youtuber

Dancers

Giuseppe Bausilio (born 1997), performs on Broadway in the titular role in the Tony-award-winning musical Billy Elliot
Flore Revalles (1889–1966), principal dancer with Ballets Russes c. 1915–1918

Filmmakers

Arthur Cohn (born 1927), film producer, received six Oscars
Marc Forster (born 1969), film director, Monster's Ball, Finding Neverland, and the James Bond movie Quantum of Solace
Jean-Luc Godard (born 1930), director, screenwriter and critic
Claude Goretta (1929–2019), director
Moritz de Hadeln (born 1940), director, film festival director

Markus Imhoof (born 1941), director
Xavier Koller (born 1944), director
Fred Roy Krug (1929), American producer, director
Daniel Schmid (1941–2006), director
Alain Tanner (born 1929), director

Mathematics

Paul Bernays (1888–1977), made significant contributions to mathematical logic, axiomatic set theory, and the philosophy of mathematics
Daniel Bernoulli (1700–1782), mathematician and physicist
Jakob Bernoulli (1654–1705), Swiss mathematician
Johann Bernoulli (1667–1748), Swiss mathematician
Daniel Bleichenbacher (born 1964), mathematician and cryptographer
Armand Borel (1923–2003), mathematician

Leonhard Euler (1707–1783), mathematician and geometer
Hugo Hadwiger (1908–1981), mathematician 
Edward Kofler (1911–2007), mathematician
Konrad Osterwalder (born 1942), mathematician and physicist
Michel Plancherel (1885–1967), mathematician
Georges de Rham (1903–1990), mathematician
Ludwig Schläfli (1814–1895), mathematician
Jakob Steiner (1796–1863), mathematician and physicist
Ernst Specker (1920–2011), mathematician 
Eduard Stiefel (1909–1978), mathematician

Military

Pierre Victor Besenval de Bronstatt (1721–1791)
Guillaume-Henri Dufour (1787–1875), General, geographer
Henri Guisan (1874–1960), General during World War II
Hans Herzog (1819–1894), General 1870–1871
Antoine-Henri Jomini (1779–1869), General, military writer

Christophe Keckeis (born 1945), Chief of the Armed Forces (2004–2007)
Elmar Mäder, commander of the Swiss Guard (2002–)
Pius Segmüller (born 1952), commander of the Swiss Guard (1998–2002)
Theophil Sprecher von Bernegg (1850–1927)
Ulrich Wille (1848–1925), General during World War I

Music 

Mia Aegerter (born 1976), pop musician
Martin Eric Ain (born 1967), Celtic Frost bassist
Ernest Ansermet (1883–1969), conductor
Lys Assia (1924–2018), singer
Chiara Banchini (born 1946), violinist, conductor
Rene Baumann (born 1968), musician, dancer, known as DJ Bobo
Bertrand Bitz (born 1978), singer and songwriter
Daniel Boemle (1960–2007), DJ and radio personality
Urs Bühler (born 1971), tenor, member of Il Divo
Dominik Burkhalter (born 1975), bandleader, composer, drummer
Caroline Charrière (1960–2018), composer, flautist, choir director, educator
Michel Corboz (born 1934), conductor
Claudia D'Addio, pop musician, Eurovision Song Contest 2006 and MusicStars contestant
Rachel Kolly d'Alba (born 1981), solo violinist
Emile Jaques-Dalcroze (1865–1950), musician, educator, developer of Eurhythmics
Philippe Decourroux (born 1962), Christian singer and drummer
Henri Dès (born 1940), singer and songwriter
Andy Egert (born 1961), blues guitarist, singer and songwriter
Electroboy (born 1974), electronic music producer
Edwin Fischer (1886–1960), pianist and conductor
Thomas Gabriel Fischer (born 1963), Celtic Frost guitarist, singer
Peter Giger (born 1939), percussionist and bandleader
Peter-Lukas Graf (born 1929), conductor
Ernst Haefliger (1919–2007), tenor
Heinz Holliger (born 1939), oboist

Arthur Honegger (1892–1955), composer
Philippe Huttenlocher (born 1942), bass
Rahel Indermaur, (born 1980) opera singer
Christian Jacob (born 1958), jazz pianist
Michael Jarrell (born 1958), composer
Daniel Kandlbauer (born 1983), pop musician and MusicStars contestant
Kuno Lauener (born 1961), lead singer of Bernese rock band Züri West
Carlos Leal (born 1969), rapper and actor; best known as a member of the hip-hop group Sens Unik
Pepe Lienhard (born 1939), band leader and saxophone player
Frank Martin (1890–1974), composer

Mani Matter (1936–1972), singer
Jojo Mayer (born 1963), drummer
Dieter Meier (born 1945), singer of electronica band Yello, which had hits "Oh Yeah" and "The Race"
Mandy Meyer (born 1960), guitarist, played in bands Asia, Gotthard and Krokus
Patrick Moraz (born 1948), keyboardist with Yes and Moody Blues
Paolo Pandolfo, violist (viola da gamba)
Zlatko Perica (born 1969), better known as "Slädu", played guitar in bands as Tangerine Dream or Gölä
Carlos Perón (born 1952), producer and former singer of electronica band Yello
Werner Reinhart (1884–1951), industrialist, philanthropist, music and literature patron
Othmar Schoeck (1886–1957), composer
Ludwig Senfl (1486–1542/3), Renaissance composer
Marc Storace (born 1951), Maltese-Swiss rock vocalist and songwriter; best known as singer of hard rock band Krokus
Eric Tappy (born 1931), tenor
Martin Tillman (born 1964), film music composer
Tina Turner (born 1939), became Swiss in 2013
Silvio Varviso (1924–2006), conductor, especially of opera
Andreas Vollenweider (born 1953), Grammy award-winning harpist
Chris von Rohr (born 1951), musician and producer; best known as bassist of hard rock band Krokus
August Wenzinger (1905–1996), cellist, violist (viola da gamba), pioneer of early music performance 
Luzia von Wyl (born 1985), composer and pianist
Roland Zoss (born 1951), rock poetry musician
Alberich Zwyssig (1808–1854), priest, composer of the Swiss Psalm
YRU, rock band formed in 2006

Philosophy

Henri Frédéric Amiel (1821–1881), philosopher and poet
Richard Avenarius (1843–1896), formulated the radical positivist doctrine of "empirical criticism"
Peter Bieri (born 1944), philosopher, author
Benjamin Constant (1767–1830)
Jeanne Hersch (1910–2000), philosopher
Henri Lauener (1933–2002), philosopher

Dominik Perler (born 1965), philosopher
Hans A. Pestalozzi (1929–2004), social critic
Alexandru Şafran (1910–2006), rabbi and philosopher

Psychology and pedagogy

Peter Baumann (1935–2011), psychiatrist
Ludwig Binswanger (1881–1966), psychologist
Eugen Bleuler (1857–1940), psychiatrist
Carl Gustav Jung (1875–1961), founder of analytical psychology
Emma Jung (1882–1955), psychoanalyst and author

Elisabeth Kübler-Ross (1926–2004), psychiatrist, pioneer in near-death studies
Max Lüscher (1923–2017), inventor of the Lüscher color test
Richard Meili (1900–1991), psychologist
Johann Heinrich Pestalozzi (1746–1827), pedagogue
Oskar Pfister (1873–1956), psychologist and pastor
Jean Piaget (1896–1980), psychologist
Hermann Rorschach (1884–1922), psychiatrist and psychoanalyst

Politics

Rosa Bloch-Bollag (1880–1922), socialist and marxist activist
Christoph Blocher (born 1940), Federal Councilor, Swiss People's Party activist
Rudolf Brun (1290s–1360), first mayor of Zurich
Gaudenz Canova (1887–1962)
Étienne Clavière (1735–1793)
Joseph Deiss (born 1946), Federal Councilor, President of the United Nations General Assembly
Élie Ducommun (1833–1906), 1902 Nobel Peace Prize
Henri Dunant (1828–1910), Founder of the Red Cross 1901 Nobel Peace Prize
Nicholas of Flüe (1417–1487), diplomat, hermit, Catholic saint

Albert Gallatin (1761–1849), US Secretary of the Treasury, diplomat
Albert Gobat (1843–1914), 1902 Nobel Peace Prize
Jörg Jenatsch (1596–1639), pastor, Protestant politician
Ursula Koch (born 1941), politician the first women president of the Social Democratic Party of Switzerland (SP) 
Carl Lutz (1895–1975), Vice-consul to Hungary during WWII, credited with saving over 62,000 Jews
Jean-Paul Marat (1743–1793), revolutionary
Giuseppe Motta (1871–1940), Federal Councilor (1911–1940) and President of the League of Nations

Napoleon III (1808–1873) (naturalized in 1832)
Jacques Necker (1732–1804), statesman and finance minister of Louis XVI
Charles Pictet de Rochemont (1755–1824), statesman, diplomat

Pompejus von Planta-Wildenberg (1569–1621)
Fritz Platten (1883–1942), Communist
Carla del Ponte (born 1947), Swiss attorney general, chief prosecutor of two international criminal law tribunals
Elisabeth von Rapperswil (around 1251 or 1261 – † 1309, probably in Rapperswil), last Countess of the House of Rapperswil
Trudy Späth (1908–1990), first woman to hold an elected office
Katharina von Zimmern (1478–1547), last abbess of the Fraumünster Abbey

See also:
List of 2005 office-holders in Switzerland
List of Federal Chancellors of Switzerland (since 1803)
List of the first female holders of political offices: Switzerland
List of mayors of Aarau, Altstätten, Arbon, Baden, Basel, Bellinzona, Bern, Biel/Bienne, Brig, Brig-Glis, Bulle, Burgdorf, Carouge, Chur, Davos, Delémont, Frauenfeld, Fribourg, Geneva, Grenchen, Herisau, Köniz, Kreuzlingen, La Chaux-de-Fonds, La Tour-de-Peilz, Lausanne, Le Châtelard, Les Planches, Liestal, Locarno, Lucerne, Lugano, Martigny, Montreux, Morges, Murten, Naters, Neuchâtel, Nyon, Olten, Rapperswil-Jona, Rheinfelden, Schaffhausen, Sierre, Sion, Solothurn, St. Gallen, Thun, Trimbach, Uster, Vevey, Wädenswil, Wil, Winterthur, Yverdon, Zofingen, Zug, Zürich
List of members of the Swiss Council of States (current)
List of members of the Swiss Federal Council (since 1848)
List of members of the Swiss National Council (current)
List of officials of the Helvetic Republic (1798–1803)
List of presidents of the Swiss Confederation (since 1848)
List of presidents of the Swiss Council of States (since 1848)
List of presidents of the Swiss Diet (before 1848)
List of presidents of the Swiss National Council (since 1848)

Religion

Jakob Abbadie (1654–1727), Protestant preacher
Gilberto Agustoni (1922–2017), cardinal
Jacob Amman (1644–?)
Karl Barth (1886–1968), theologian
Heinrich Bullinger (1504–1575), reformer in Zurich
Georges Cottier (1922–2016), cardinal, theologian
Niklaus Manuel Deutsch (1484–1530), painter, dramatician, politician and reformer in Berne
Johann Augustanus Faber (c.1470–c.1530), theologian and historian
William Farel (1489–1565), reformer in Lausanne
Theodosius Florentini (1808–1865)
Gaston Frommel (1862–1906)
Berchtold Haller (1492–1536), reformer in Berne
Karl Rudolf Hagenbach (1801–1874)
Johann Jakob Herzog (1805–1882)
Hans Küng (1928–2021), theologian

Johann Kaspar Lavater (1741–1801), pastor and physiognomist
Oswald Myconius (1488–1552)
Johannes Oecolampadius (1482–1531), reformer in Basel
Frère Roger (1915–2005), founder of Taizé
Philip Schaff (1819–1893)
Henri Schwery (1932–2021), cardinal, former Bishop of Sion
Erika Sutter, medical missionary to South Africa
Clemens Thoma (1932–2011)
Alexandre Rodolphe Vinet (1797–1847), theologian and critic
Pierre Viret (1511–1571), reformer in Vaud Canton
Lukas Vischer (1926–2008), theologian and writer
Johann Jakob Wettstein (1693–1754), theologian
John Joachim Zubly (Hans Joachim Züblin) (1724–1781), pastor, delegate to the Continental Congress
Huldrych Zwingli (1484–1531), reformer in Zurich

Science

A-F

Alexander Emanuel Agassiz (1835–1910), American man of science
Louis Agassiz (1807–1873), did work on ice ages, glaciers
Jacob Amsler (1823–1912), mathematician and inventor of measuring instruments
Werner Arber (born 1929), 1978 Nobel Prize in Physiology or Medicine
Johann Georg Baiter (1801–1877), philologist
Adolph Francis Alphonse Bandelier (1840–1914), archaeologist
Jean-François Bergier (1931–2009), historian
Eugen Bleuler (1857–1940), psychiatrist
Felix Bloch (1905–1983), 1952 Nobel Prize in Physics
Hans Bluntschli (1877–1962), anatomist
Charles Bonnet (1720–1793), botanist
Daniel Bovet (born 1907–1992), 1957 Nobel Prize in Physiology or Medicine

Joost Bürgi (1552–1632), mathematician and watchmaker
Johann Büttikofer (1850–1929), zoologist
Jean-André Deluc (1727–1817), geologist
Paul Dirac (1902–1984), physicist
Albert Einstein (1879–1955), 1921 Nobel Prize in Physics
Richard R. Ernst (1933–2021), 1991 Nobel Prize in Chemistry
Edmond H. Fischer (1920–2021), 1992 Nobel Prize in Physiology or Medicine
Fritz Fischer (1898–1947), physicist
Auguste Forel (1848–1931), myrmecologist, psychiatrist, neurologist
François-Alphonse Forel (1841–1912), pioneer in the study of lakes
Johann Kaspar Füssli (1743–1786), entomologist

G-O

Conrad Gessner (1516–1565)
Jules Gonin (1870–1935), ophthalmologist
Gustav Guanella (1909–1982), electronics engineer, inventor
André Guignard (born 1942), engineer
Charles-Edouard Guillaume (1861–1938), 1920 Nobel Prize in Physics
Albrecht von Haller (1708–1777)
Walter Hess (1881–1973), 1949 Nobel Prize in Physiology or Medicine
Carl Hilty (1833–1909), jurist
Albert Hofmann (1906–2008), chemist, discoverer of d-lysergic acid diethylamide (LSD)
Eugen Huber (1849–1923), jurist
François Huber (1750–1831), naturalist
Otto Frederick Hunziker (1873–1959), dairy professor and technical innovator

Stefan Janos (born 1943), low temperature physicist
Paul Karrer (1889–1971), 1937 Nobel Prize in Chemistry
Emil Theodor Kocher (1841–1917), 1909 Nobel Prize in Physiology or Medicine
Jean Charles Galissard de Marignac (1817–1894), chemist
Michel Mayor (born 1942), astronomer
Friedrich Miescher (1844–1895), physician and biologist, discovered DNA
Johannes von Müller (1752–1809), historian
K. Alex Müller (1927–2023), 1987 Nobel Prize in Physics
Paul Müller (1899–1965), 1948 Nobel Prize in Physiology or Medicine
Jean-Daniel Nicoud (born 1938), computer scientist and researcher
Johann Caspar von Orelli (1787–1849)

P-Z

Paracelsus (1493–1541) (Theophrastus Bombastus von Hohenheim), alchemist
Wolfgang Pauli (1900–1958), 1945 Nobel Prize in Physics
Jean Piaget (1896–1980), psychologist
Auguste Piccard (1884–1962), physicist and balloonist
Bertrand Piccard (born 1958), psychiatrist and balloonist
Jacques Piccard (1922–2008), engineer and underwater explorer
Jean Piccard (1884–1963), balloonist
François-Jules Pictet de la Rive (1809–1872), zoologist and paleontologist
Raoul Pictet (1846–1929), physicist
Adolf Portmann (1897–1982), zoologist
Vladimir Prelog (1906–1998), 1975 Nobel Prize in Chemistry
Didier Queloz (born 1966), astronomer
Tadeus Reichstein (1897–1996), chemist, 1950 Nobel Prize in Physiology or Medicine
Eugene Renevier (1831–1906), geologist
Heinrich Rohrer (1933–2013), 1986 Nobel Prize in Physics
Heinz Rutishauser (1918–1970), mathematician, computer software pioneer

Leopold Ružička (1887–1976), 1939 Nobel Prize in Chemistry
Johann Jakob Scheuchzer (1672–1733), Swiss savant
Louis Secretan (1758–1839), mycologist
Jack Steinberger (1921–2020), 1988 Nobel Prize in Physics
Ernst Stueckelberg (1905–1984), theoretical physicist
Alfred Werner (1866–1919), 1913 Nobel Prize in Chemistry
Niklaus Wirth (born 1934), computer scientist, Turing Award winner, inventor of the Pascal programming language
Kurt Wüthrich (born 1938), 2002 Nobel Prize in Chemistry
Daniel Albert Wyttenbach (1746–1820)
Alexandre Yersin (1894–1943), physician, isolated the Yersinia pestis
Rolf M. Zinkernagel (born 1944), 1996 Nobel Prize in Physiology or Medicine
Fritz Zwicky (1898–1974), astronomer
Theodor Zwinger (1533–1588), scholar

Sports

Paul Accola (born 1967), skiing champion
David Aebischer (born 1978), former National Hockey League goaltender
 Jeff Agoos (born 1968), Swiss-born American soccer defender
Daniel Albrecht (born 1983), alpine skier
Simon Ammann (born 1981), gold medallist in ski jumping at the 2002 Winter Olympics, ski jumping at the 2010 Winter Olympics
Manuel Bachmann (born 1975), footballer
 Timea Bacsinszky (born 1989), tennis player
Sven Bärtschi (born 1992), National Hockey League player for the Vancouver Canucks
Madeleine Berthod (born 1931), 1956 gold medallist in downhill skiing
Denise Biellmann (born 1962), world champion figure skater
Sepp Blatter (born 1935), FIFA president 
Clint Capela (born 1994), NBA player for the Houston Rockets 
Ursula Bruhin (born 1970), snowboarder
Fabian Cancellara (born 1981), cyclist
Claudio Castagnoli (born 1980), pro wrestler
Stéphane Chapuisat (born 1969), footballer
Dario Cologna (born 1986), cross-country skiing champion
Didier Cuche (born 1974), alpine skier
Didier Défago, (born 1977), alpine skier
Johan Djourou (born 1987), footballer
Oscar Egg (1890–1961), cyclist
Roger Federer (born 1981), tennis champion: 20-time Grand Slam singles champion
Michela Figini (born 1966), alpine skiing champion
Marcel Fischer (born 1978), fencing champion, gold medallist in Athens Olympics
Alexander Frei (born 1979), footballer
Tanja Frieden (born 1976), snowboarder
Martin Gerber (born 1974), NHL goaltender for the Ottawa Senators

Arnold Gerschwiler (1914–2003), skater
Hans Gerschwiler (1920), world champion figure skater
Jack Gerschwiler (1898–2000), coach
Stefan Grogg (born 1974), ice hockey player, member of Swiss National Team 1997
Franz Heinzer (born 1962), alpine skier
Stéphane Henchoz (born 1974), footballer
Erika Hess (born 1962), alpine skiing champion
Martina Hingis (born 1980), tennis champion; five-time Grand Slam singles champion
Nico Hischier (born 1999), NHL forward for the New Jersey Devils; first Swiss player to be drafted #1 overall in the NHL Entry Draft
Jakob Hlasek (born 1964), tennis player
Ambrosi Hoffmann (born 1977), alpine skiing medalist
Andy Hug (1964–2000), karate and kickboxing champion
Benjamin Huggel (born 1977), professional footballer
Patrick Hürlimann (born 1963), Olympic curling champion
Roman Josi (born 1990), NHL defenseman for the Nashville Predators
 Natan Jurkovitz (born 1995), French-Swiss-Israeli basketball player for Hapoel Be'er Sheva of the Israeli Basketball Premier League

Bruno Kernen (born 1972), alpine skier, bronze medalist and former world champion in downhill
Bruno Kernen (born 1961), alpine skier, winner of the 1983 Kitzbühel downhill race
Hugo Koblet (1925–1964), cycling champion
Franz Krienbühl (1929–2002), speed skater
Andreas Küttel (born 1979), ski jumper
Stéphane Lambiel (born 1985), figure skater, Olympic silver medalist
Peter Lüscher (born 1956), alpine skiing champion
Daniela Meuli (born 1981), snowboarder
Lise-Marie Morerod (born 1956), alpine skiing champion
Layla Schwarz (born 1981), Professional Basketball Player
Nicolas Müller (born 1982), snowboarder
Peter Müller (born 1957), alpine skiing champion
Xeno Müller (born 1972), rower, Olympic gold medalist
Marie-Theres Nadig (born 1954), alpine skiing champion
Sonja Nef (born 1972), alpine skiing champion
Maya Pedersen (born 1972), skeleton athlete
Manuela Pesko (born 1978), snowboarder
Alina Popa (born 1978), IFBB professional bodybuilder
Walter Prager (1910–1984), alpine skiing champion
Clay Regazzoni (1939–2006), racing driver
Corinne Rey-Bellet (1972–2006), alpine skier
Tony Rominger (born 1961), cyclist who won major tours four times in his career
Marc Rosset (born 1970), tennis player, gold medallist in Barcelona Olympics
Bernhard Russi (born 1948), alpine skiing champion
Martina Schild (born 1981), downhill skiing champion
Hedy Schlunegger (1923–2003), downhill Olympic champion of 1948
Vreni Schneider (born 1964), alpine skiing champion
Patty Schnyder (born 1978), professional tennis player
Thabo Sefolosha (born 1984), NBA player for the Oklahoma City Thunder 
Philippe Senderos (born 1985), footballer
Xherdan Shaqiri (born 1991), professional footballer
Mark Streit (born 1977), NHL defenceman for the Philadelphia Flyers
Alain Sutter (born 1968), footballer
Kubilay Türkyilmaz (born 1967), footballer
Maria Walliser (born 1963), alpine skiing champion
Stanislas Wawrinka (born 1985), professional tennis player
Jean Wicki (born 1933), gold medallist in bobsleigh
Granit Xhaka, footballer (born 1992)
Hakan Yakin (born 1977), footballer
Murat Yakin (born 1974), footballer
Heidi Zurbriggen (born 1967), skier
Matthias Zurbriggen (1856–1917), mountain guide and alpinist
Pirmin Zurbriggen (born 1963), alpine skiing champion
Silvan Zurbriggen (born 1981), skier

Writers

Peter Bichsel (born 1935)
S. Corinna Bille (1912–1979)
Ida Bindschedler (1854–1919)
Silvio Blatter (born 1946)
Charles Victor de Bonstetten (1745–1832)
Nicolas Bouvier (1929–1998)
Willy Bretscher (1897–1992), newspaper writer and editor
Raymond Bruckert (born 1935), writer of novels and educational books
Hermann Burger (1942–1989), author, poet, literary scholar, editor
Erika Burkart (1922–2010), poet
Elias Canetti (1905–1994), 1981 Nobel Prize in Literature, Swiss resident
Blaise Cendrars (Frédéric Louis Sauser) (1887–1961), author
Victor Cherbuliez (1829–1899), member of the Académie française
Jacques Chessex (1934–2009)
Anne Cuneo (1936–2015)
Erich von Däniken (born 1935), Ancient Astronauts writer
Martin R. Dean (born 1955), writer
Friedrich Dürrenmatt (1921–1990), author and dramatist
Marianne Ehrmann (1755–1795), one of the first women novelists and publicists in the German-speaking countries
Heinrich Federer (1866–1928)

Jürg Federspiel (1931–2007)
Max Frisch (1911–1991), author and architect
Salomon Gessner (1730–1788)
Friedrich Glauser (1896–1938)
Jeremias Gotthelf (Albert Bitzius) (1797–1854), author and pastor
Stefan Haenni (born 1958)
Eveline Hasler (born 1933)
Markus Hediger (born 1959)
Hermann Hesse (1877–1962), 1946 Nobel Prize in Literature, Swiss resident
Franz Hohler (born 1943), author and comedian
Felix Indermaur, author, storyteller, winemaker
Hans-Ulrich Indermaur (born 1939) author, magazine editor, and reporter
Mirjam Indermaur (born 1967), writer and businesswoman
Philippe Jaccottet (1925–2021)
Zoë Jenny (born 1974)
Gottfried Keller (1819–1890), author
Christian Kracht (born 1966), author

Hugo Loetscher (1929–2009), author
Ella Maillart (1903–1997)

Niklaus Meienberg (1940–1993)
Conrad Ferdinand Meyer (1825–1898)
Adolf Muschg (born 1934)
Suzanne Necker, née Suzanne Curchod (1739–1794)
Juste Olivier (1807–1876)
Giorgio Orelli (1921–2013), poet, translator
Giovanni Orelli (1928–2016), poet, teacher
Daniele Pantano (born 1976), poet, translator, editor
Erica Pedretti (1930–2022), author and artist
Eugène Rambert (1830–1886)
Charles Ferdinand Ramuz (1878–1947), writer
Grisélidis Réal (1929–2005)
William Ritter (1867–1955), novelist and music critic
Alice Rivaz (1901–1998), writer
Gustave Roud (1897–1976), poet
Denis de Rougemont (1906–1985)
Léon Savary (1895–1968), writer and journalist
Jakob Schaffner (1875–1944)
Josias Simmler (1530–1576), theologian, historian
Victor Snell (1874–1931), journalist
Carl Spitteler (1845–1924), 1919 Nobel Prize in Literature
Johanna Spyri (1827–1901), author of Heidi

Anne Louise Germaine de Staël (Madame de Staël) (1766–1817)
Peter Stamm (born 1963)
Albert Steffen (1884–1963), writer, anthroposophist
Otto Steiger (1909–2005) 
Gottfried Strasser (1854–1912)
Martin Suter (born 1948), columnist and novelist
Rudolf Sutermeister (1802–1868)
Robert Walser (1878–1956)
Otto F. Walter (1928–1994), novelist
Silja Walter (1919–2011), sister of Otto F. Walter; Benedictinian nun and writer
Markus Werner (1944–2016)
Urs Widmer (1938–2014)
Johann David Wyss (1743–1818), author of The Swiss Family Robinson
Albin Zollinger (1885–1941)
Fritz Zorn (Fritz Angst) (1944–1976), author of Mars
Roland Zoss (born 1951)
Johann Heinrich Daniel Zschokke (1771–1848)

Legendary and folk heroes

Helvetia, personification ("mother") of Switzerland
Arnold von Melchtal, legendary founding father of Switzerland
Ueli Rotach, legendary hero of the 1405 battle at Stoss

William Tell, legendary 14th-century hero
Arnold von Winkelried, legendary hero of the 1386 battle of Sempach

Others

Sarah, Crown Princess of Brunei (born 1987), wife of Crown Prince Al-Muhtadee Billah, half Swiss and half Bruneian
Othmar Ammann (1879–1965), civil engineer, bridge engineer to the New York Port Authority
Nick Auf der Maur (1942–1998), Canadian journalist, Swiss parents
Louise Bachofen-Burckhardt (1845–1920), art collector
Maximilian Bircher-Benner (1867–1939), physician and Muesli inventor
Johann Georg Bodmer (1786–1864), inventor
Johann Jakob Bodmer (1698–1783)
Hans Ormund Bringolf (1876–1951), adventurer and autobiographer
Jacob Burckhardt (1818–1897), art historian
Johann Ludwig Burckhardt (1784–1814), traveller and orientalist
Michée Chauderon (died 1652), the last person to be executed for sorcery in Geneva
Arthur Cohn (born 1927), film producer, received six Oscars
Kadie Karen Diekmeyer (born 1965), Canadian vegan activist and Internet personality, known online as That Vegan Teacher.
Lydia Welti-Escher (1858–1891), Swiss patron of the arts and founder of the Gottfried Keller Stiftung
Philipp Emanuel von Fellenberg (1771–1844)
Marie Grossholtz (1761–1850), known as Madame Tussaud
Paul Grueninger (1891–1972), commander of police and humanitarian
Felix Hemmerlin (1388/9 – c. 1460), theologian
Michelle Hunziker (born 1977), TV presenter previously married to the Italian singer Eros Ramazzotti

Ingvar Kamprad (1926–2018), founder of IKEA, Swiss resident 1976-2014
Carl Lutz (1895–1975), diplomat and humanitarian
Robert Maillart (1872–1940), civil engineer, inventor of many concrete bridge techniques
Peter Hildebrand Meienberg (1929–2021), missionary
Christoph Meili (born 1968), whistle-blower
Christian Menn (1927–2018), civil engineer
Max Miedinger (1910–1980), typeface designer, inventor of Helvetica
Claude Nobs (1936–2013), founder and general manager of the Montreux Jazz Festival
Rosa Rein (1897–2010), oldest living Swiss
Werner Reinhart (1884–1951), philanthropist, music and literature patron
Archibald Reiss (1875–1929), criminologist
Beat Richner (1947–2018), pediatrician, founder of children's hospitals in Cambodia
Niklaus Riggenbach (1817–1899), engineer
Frithjof Schuon (1907–1998), Sufi writer, born in Basel
John Sutter (1803–1880), California settler
Stefi Talman (born 1958), shoe designer
Alain Tanner (born 1929), film director
Lukas Vischer (1780–1840), collector, traveler, artist

See also

List of Germans 
List of mountains of Switzerland named after people
Lists of people by nationality - for other lists of people by nationality, ethnicity, citizenship, language, or location
Swiss longevity recordholders

References